Edayattoor is a small village in Annamanada panchayat, Trichur District, Kerala state in India.

This village is located on Annamanada Mala Road, just 2 km from Annamanada bus station. Neighboring villages of Edayatttoor are:
Annamanada (to the east),
Meladoor (to the west),
Kumbidi (to the south), and
Vennur (to the north).

References

Villages in Thrissur district